A lapel pin, also known as an enamel pin, is a small pin worn on clothing, often on the lapel of a jacket, attached to a bag, or displayed on a piece of fabric. Lapel pins can be ornamental or can indicate the wearer's affiliation with an organization or cause. Before the popularity of wearing lapel pins, boutonnières were worn.

Popular usage 

Lapel pins are frequently used as symbols of achievement and belonging in different organizations. Lapel pins from the organization are often collected by members and non-members alike.

Businesses, corporates, & political parties also use lapel pins to designate achievement and membership. Lapel pins are a common element of employee recognition programs, and they are presented to individuals as a symbol of an accomplishment. Like fraternity and sorority pins, these lapel pins instill a sense of belonging to an elite group of performers at the organization. Businesses also award lapel pins to employees more frequently to boost employee morale, productivity, and employee engagement.

The Soviet Union had great production of these. Besides pins showing political figures and as souvenirs for tourist spots, there were pins for various sports, cultural, and political gatherings and for technical achievements of the Soviet Union. 

In recent years, pin collecting and trading has also become a popular hobby. Demand for pin designs based on popular cartoon characters and themes such as Disney, Betty Boop, and Hard Rock Cafe has surged and led to the creation of pin trading events and other social activities. Disney pin trading is a prime example of this.

Cultural significance
In the USSR and the People's Republic of China, the prominent lapel pins with portraits of Lenin and Mao Zedong, respectively, were worn by youth as well as by Communist party members or people who felt like showing their official political credo. In Czechoslovakia, the Mao badges/pins were worn in the late 1960s and early 1970s by non-conformist youth as a prank and a way to provoke the "normalisationist" reactionaries of the purged post-1968 Communist Party of Czechoslovakia.

In the 1970s, initiates of Guru Maharaj Ji extensively used buttons, sometimes quite large, with images of the guru's face on them.

Politicians in the United States often wear American flag lapel pins, especially after the attacks of September 11, 2001. By 2008, the flag pin had become "the quickest sartorial method for a politician to telegraph his or her patriotism." The practice declined somewhat in the following decade.

Modern manufacturing process

Almost all manufacturing is currently done in China, specifically in and around Kunshan, a satellite city in the greater Suzhou region that is administratively at the county-level in southeast Jiangsu, China, just outside Shanghai. Inexpensive labor in China has made non-Chinese production of lapel pins few and far between. There are still multiple online shops run by people outside of China who make and sell lapel pins.

In the die struck manufacturing process, there are five basic types of pins: Cloisonné, soft enamel, photo etched, screen printed and 4-color printed. In all processes, the outer shape of the pin is stamped out from a sheet of steel, aluminum, copper, brass, or iron. In the case of cloisonne and soft enamel, the shape and the design are stamped out.

 Cloisonné Sometimes called epola (imitation cloisonné) or hard enamel, cloisonné is stamped out from a sheet of copper. The stamping leaves recessed areas, or pools, which are filled with enamel powder and high fired at 800° to 900°. After cooling, the surface of the pin is ground down to a smooth finish and then the copper is plated.

 Soft enamel This process is like epola and cloisonné in that strips of metal separate areas of color. Unlike Cloisonné, the areas of color rest below the metal strip surface, which can be felt when you run your finger over the surface. Like the photo etched process, the top can be covered with protective epoxy so that the piece appears smooth.

 Photo etched In the photo etch process, only the shape of the piece is stamped out. The design on the face of the pin is chemically etched into the base metal, then color-filled by hand and baked before being polished. In the final step, a thin coat of clear epoxy can be applied to the surface.

 Photo dome The photo dome process begins by printing the art or design on vinyl or paper and then applying it to a metal pin base. The vinyl is then coated with an epoxy dome that protects the art from wear and the elements. This process is gaining in popularity because of advances in printing resolutions and the ability to complete these pins quickly in the United States.

 Screen printed Screen printing, a.k.a. silk screening, is produced by applying each color to the metal base using a "silk screen" process. These are blocks of solid color. A very thin epoxy coat protects the color material from scratching.

 4-color process 4-color process, a.k.a. offset printing, allows for bleeds and blends of colors, as is used in magazines. The colors are printed in the traditional CMYK process. This style is can be used for complex art and photo reproduction. An unlimited number of colors can be used.

Backside

The backside of a lapel pin holds the pin in place, and attachment pieces come in a variety of styles.

Butterfly clutch – One of the most popular modern methods of attaching pins is the butterfly clutch, sometimes called a military clutch. The back of the pin has a small prong attached and when the butterfly clutch is squeezed and pulled up from the prong the pin is released from the clutch. Butterfly clutches may be made out of metal, plastic, or rubber. Also known as a dammit.
Jewelry clutch – The jewelry clutch, or tie tack, is a simple but elegant design. The clutch locks into place when it covers the prong.
Safety clasp – A safety clasp is similar to a safety pin in design. A long pin prong tucks under a small hook or clasp to hold the pin in place.
Magnetic clasp – Magnetic clasps are composed of a small disc magnet that is attracted to another magnet that is attached to the back of the pin. Although this method is generally less secure, it is designed to prevent hole punctures in garments. Bar magnet clasps help disperse the tension with two sets of magnets.
Screw and nut – A screw and nut clasp is one of the most secure. The prong is threaded so that the nut screws into place to hold the pin firmly.
Stick pin – A stick pin has a thin needle with a collar that slides up and down the needle to secure or release the pin.

See also

 Award pin
 Boutonnière
 Brooch
 Collar pin
 Campaign button
 Disney pin trading
 Kim Il-sung and Kim Jong-il badges
 Pin
 Pin-back button
 Pin trading

References

External links

Award items
Badges
Fashion accessories